Stephen Derek Ford (born 17 February 1959) is an English former footballer who played in the Football League for Stoke City.

Career
Ford was born in Shoreham-by-Sea and played amateur football with local side Lewes before being given a contract by First Division side Stoke City in 1981. He made two appearances for the club towards the end of the 1981–82 season. He left for Stafford Rangers at the end of the season after failing to make it as a professional footballer with Stoke.

Career statistics

References

English footballers
Stoke City F.C. players
Stafford Rangers F.C. players
Lewes F.C. players
English Football League players
1959 births
Living people
Association football forwards